Cunninghamites is an extinct genus of conifers in the family Cupressaceae of the European Late Cretaceous flora.

References

External links

Cupressaceae
Conifer genera
Prehistoric gymnosperm genera
Late Cretaceous plants
Late Cretaceous genera
Late Cretaceous first appearances
Late Cretaceous genus extinctions